Presley Store (also known as the Webby Building) is a historic building in Springville, Alabama.  It was built in 1902 for the general store of brothers Porter and John Presley.  The one-story frame building has board-and-batten siding on the sides and rear.  The cast iron storefront has two recessed entrances and a tall and ornate pressed metal cornice.  At the time, it was one of the most elaborate commercial buildings in the small town.  The interior was originally one large space with a storeroom behind, but has since been divided into two spaces.

The store was listed on the National Register of Historic Places in 1983.

References

National Register of Historic Places in St. Clair County, Alabama
Commercial buildings completed in 1902